Roskam is a hamlet in the Dutch municipality of Roerdalen. It is located between the larger towns of Posterholt and Sint Odiliënberg.

Roskam is not a statistical entity, and the postal authorities have placed it under Sint Odiliënberg. It consists of a handful of houses.

References 

Populated places in Limburg (Netherlands)
Roerdalen